Rana Mubashir Iqbal is a Pakistani politician who has been a member of the National Assembly of Pakistan since August 2018.

Political career
He was elected to the National Assembly of Pakistan from Constituency NA-134 (Lahore-XII) as a candidate of Pakistan Muslim League (N) in 2012 Pakistani general election and again in 2018.
He was also elected as a member of provincial assembly in 2008.

References

Living people
Pakistani MNAs 2018–2023
Pakistan Muslim League (N) politicians
Year of birth missing (living people)